Molejo is a pagode musical group formed in Rio de Janeiro in 1995 by Anderson Leonardo, Andrezinho, Wander Pires, Claumirzinho, Lúcio Nascimento, and Vadinho.

Brazilian musical groups
Samba ensembles
Pagode musical groups
1995 establishments in Brazil
Musical groups established in 1995
Musical groups from Rio de Janeiro (city)